My Foolish Heart is a 2018 Dutch biographical film by Rolf van Eijk. It follows a police detective in Amsterdam who tries to reconstruct the final days of Chet Baker before his death on 13 May 1988. The film was Van Eijk's feature film directorial debut.

My Foolish Heart premiered at the 2018 Netherlands Film Festival.

Plot
Amsterdam 1988. Police detective Lucas tries to reconstruct the events that lead to the death of jazz musician Chet Baker. He meets with his final lover Sarah, loyal friend Simon and strange admirer Doctor Feelgood. He learns about Baker's tragic life as a problematic heroin user and lonely soul. While he conducts his investigation Lucas is confronted with his own darker side.

Cast
 Steve Wall – Chet Baker
 Gijs Naber – Lucas
 Lynsey Beauchamp – Sarah
 Arjan Ederveen- Doctor Feelgood
 Raymond Thiry – Simon
 Paloma Aguilera Valdebenito
 Antony Acheampong
 Medina Schuurman
 Horace Cohen

See also
 Born to be Blue, also about Chet Baker's final days.

References

External links
 
 Review in Filmkrant
 Review on the VPRO site
 Review in NRC Handelsblad.
 Review in Film Totaal.
 Article on Eyefilm.

2010s biographical films
2010s musical films
2018 films
Biographical films about musicians
Cultural depictions of Chet Baker
Dutch biographical films
Dutch musical films
2010s Dutch-language films
Films about heroin addiction
Films set in 1988
Films set in Amsterdam
Films shot in Amsterdam
Jazz films
2010s English-language films